Sarah Langman (formerly Willacy) is an Australian women's professional soccer player who currently plays as a goalkeeper for Perth Glory.

Club career

Adelaide United
In 2014, Langman joined Adelaide United. She made her debut for Adelaide United in a 3–3 draw against Melbourne Victory. In September 2020, Adelaide United announced that Langman would not re-sign for the 2020–21 W-League season.

Western Sydney Wanderers
A few weeks after announcing that she wouldn't re-sign with Adelaide United, Langman joined W-League club, Western Sydney Wanderers.

Perth Glory
In July 2022, Langman joined Perth Glory on a one-year contract.

Club statistics

References

External links
 Sarah Willacy at Soccerway

1995 births
Living people
A-League Women players
Adelaide United FC (A-League Women) players
Western Sydney Wanderers FC (A-League Women) players
Women's association football goalkeepers
Australian women's soccer players